Stephen Christian is an American singer and songwriter best known as the lead vocalist of the alternative rock band Anberlin, as well as the vocalist of his acoustic side-project Anchor & Braille. He and his bandmates started Anberlin in 2002, after the demise of their previous group, known as SaGoh 24/7. He is one of the main songwriters for Anberlin alongside Joseph Milligan, and with the band had released seven albums before their initial disbandment in 2014 and began working on an eighth album in 2020. Many of the albums in the Anberlin discography have peaked in the top ten on various Billboard charts.

He founded the non-profit and humanitarian-oriented band Faceless International, and is the founder of Wood Water Records, the home of Anchor & Braille. Christian wrote and self-published the memoir The Orphaned Anything's (2008). Christian also started the solo project Anchor & Braille in 2007, and their debut album Felt, produced by Aaron Marsh of Copeland, was released in 2009. Felt debuted at number 30 on the Billboard Top Heatseekers chart. They released a second album, The Quiet Life, in 2012, with Christian again handling vocals and songwriting. A reviewer on Absolutepunk called The Quiet Life "a chaotic beauty of an album as well as [Christian's] most personal and eloquent effort to date."

On October 30, 2018, Calvary Church of Clearwater, Florida announced that Christian will assume the role of director of worship and creative arts in January 2019, and on August 26, 2019, Christian announced that he would be the campus pastor for Grace Family Church's South Tampa Campus.

Early life and education

Stephen Christian was born in Kalamazoo, Michigan.

At some point in his early life, Christian moved to Winter Haven, Florida. Christian attended Winter Haven High School along with bandmates Deon Rexroat and Joseph Milligan. During high school, the three formed the punk band SaGoh 24/7 with Joey Bruce, which eventually transformed into Anberlin. Christian's younger brother Paul was an influence on some of the band's music. They released two albums, Servants After God's Own Heart (1999), and Then I Corrupt Youth (2001), with Christian singing lead vocals on both.

Christian is a graduate from University of Central Florida and the Florida State University College of Law, with a bachelor's degree in Psychology. He attended college to study non-profits, with plans to work for Habitat for Humanity or UNICEF, but Anberlin was signed a month after he graduated.

Music career

2002–14: Anberlin

Following the signing of Anberlin, Christian wrote many of the band's albums. Anberlin has released seven albums: Blueprints for the Black Market, Never Take Friendship Personal, Cities, New Surrender, and Dark Is the Way, Light Is a Place,  Vital, and Lowborn. Anberlin has also released a compilation album, Lost Songs. They released their final album in 2014.

Christian wrote a memoir, The Orphaned Anything's, which was self-published via iUniverse in early 2008.

2007–14: Anchor & Braille, Wood Water Records 

He is also the founder of Anchor & Braille's label, Wood Water Records, which is distributed through Universal Music Group, which Anberlin is signed to. He founded the acoustic group Anchor & Braille, and they released a 7" single in 2007. He wrote all songs and performed vocals on their 2009 album Felt, which was recorded in 2008. The album was released through Christian's own label Wood Water Records and Federal Distribution on August 4, 2009 and was produced, engineered and mixed by Aaron Marsh from fellow Florida-based band Copeland. Felt debuted at number 30 on the Billboard Top Heatseekers chart.

His 2012 album with Anchor & Braille, The Quiet Life, was well-received by critics, with most of the praise directed at Christian's songwriting. Of "Goes Without Saying", Artist Direct called it "One of the most brilliant and beautiful entries into Christian's catalog, and it's the perfect prelude to the sonic majesty contained in The Quiet Life."

2015–present: Worship leader 

After a final world tour with Anberlin, Christian followed what he described as God's leading to serve as director of worship at Calvary Chapel in Albuquerque, New Mexico.

Calvary Church in Clearwater, Florida announced that Christian would return to the Tampa Bay region to assume the role of director of worship and creative arts on January 6, 2019. He accepted the role of campus pastor of Grace Family Church's South Tampa Campus on August 26, 2019.

Style and influences

Christian has stated that his interest in humanitarian efforts has influenced the themes of several of Anberlin's songs.

Publishing history
Books
 The Orphaned Anything's (February 2008)

Discography

With SaGoh 24/7
Studio albums
1999: Servants After God's Own Heart – lead vocals
2001: Then I Corrupt Youth – lead vocals

With Anberlin

Studio albums
2003: Blueprints for the Black Market – lead vocals
2005: Never Take Friendship Personal – lead vocals
2007: Cities – lead vocals
2007: Lost Songs – lead vocals
2008: New Surrender – lead vocals, guitar, piano, synthesizer
2010: Dark Is the Way, Light Is a Place – lead vocals
2012: Vital – lead vocals
2013: Devotion – lead vocals
2014: Lowborn – lead vocals

With Anchor & Braille

As a solo artist
2017: Wildfires
2021: Spirited

Collaborations

The following is an incomplete list of songs that have Stephen Christian featured as either a vocalist or songwriter:
 2009: Craig Owens – With Love EP (featured vocalist on the song "Products of Poverty")
 2011: Hyland – "The One That Got Away" (featuring Stephen Christian during the chorus)
 2015: Fireflight – "Safety" (featuring Stephen Christian), on Innova
 Horsell Common – "I'm Dead" (featuring Stephen Christian)
 2022: Zakk Cash - “Goodbye” (featured vocalist)
 Esteban – "Follow" (featuring Stephen Christian)
 Greek Fire – "I'm Afraid of Americans" (featuring Stephen Christian)
 Number One Gun – "Disappear" (featuring Stephen Christian), on This Is All We Know

See also
List of singer-songwriters

Further reading
Interview: Stephen Christian of Anberlin  by Songfacts (January 3, 2013)
Interview: Anberlin’s Stephen Christian by Vulture Magazine (August 18, 2014)
Interview: John O'Callaghan (the Maine) and Stephen Christian (Anberlin) talk co-headlining by Alt Press (October 15, 2013)
Video: Interview with Stephen Christian by Real Feels (August 19, 2014)

References

Living people
American performers of Christian music
American indie pop musicians
American male singers
American rock singers
Singers from Michigan
People from Kalamazoo, Michigan
Songwriters from Michigan
University of Central Florida alumni
Year of birth missing (living people)
American male songwriters